Dryopteris carthusiana is a species of fern native to damp forests throughout the Holarctic Kingdom. It is known as the narrow buckler-fern in the United Kingdom, and as the spinulose woodfern in North America.

It is a tetraploid of hybrid origin, one parent being Dryopteris intermedia, known in North America as the intermediate wood fern, and an unknown, apparently extinct species dubbed Dryopteris semicristata, which is also the presumed parent of the hybrid-origin Dryopteris cristata.

This fern is often confused with several other wood fern species, including D. intermedia, D. campyloptera, and D. expansa. It especially extensively shares the range of D. intermedia, but the two may be distinguished by the innermost pinnule on the bottom side of the bottom pinna: this pinnule is longer than the adjacent pinnules in D. carthusiana, but shorter or even in D. intermedia. D. carthusiana is a sub-evergreen species, its fronds surviving mild winters but dying back in harsh winters.

It is known to be able to use artificial light to grow in places which are otherwise devoid of natural light, such as Niagara Cave.

References

Dryopteris carthusiana in Flora of North America

Further reading

carthusiana
Ferns of the Americas
Ferns of Asia
Ferns of Europe
Flora of Asia
Flora of Europe
Flora of North America
Plants described in 1786